Liudmila Samsonova defeated Kaia Kanepi in the final, 4–6, 6–3, 6–3 to win the women's singles tennis title at the 2022 Washington Open. Kanepi was aiming to win her first title since 2013, and to be the oldest player to win a WTA Tour title since Serena Williams in 2020.

Jessica Pegula was the defending champion from when the event was last held in 2019, but lost in the second round to Daria Saville.

Seeds

Draw

Finals

Top half

Bottom half

Qualifying

Seeds

Qualifiers

Lucky losers

Qualifying draw

First qualifier

Second qualifier

Third qualifier

Fourth qualifier

References

External links
Main draw
Qualifying draw

Citi Open - Women's Singles